Adrines is the name given to three small beaches in the bay of Panormos on the island of Skopelos. The local legend is that a pirate queen, "Adrina", drowned herself there.

Skopelos
Populated places in the Sporades